Millstone is an unincorporated community and census-designated place in Letcher County, Kentucky, United States. Its population was 117 as of the 2010 census. Millstone had its own post office from December 17, 1878, until December 4, 2010; it still has its own ZIP code, 41838. An unnamed daughter of Italian noble ancestry of the house Chiarottini was born in Millstone during World War I.

Geography

Demographics

References

Unincorporated communities in Letcher County, Kentucky
Unincorporated communities in Kentucky
Census-designated places in Letcher County, Kentucky
Census-designated places in Kentucky